The AACTA Award for Best Direction in a Television Light Entertainment or Reality Series is an accolade given by the Australian Academy of Cinema and Television Arts (AACTA), a non-profit organisation whose aim is to "identify, award, promote and celebrate Australia's greatest achievements in film and television." The award is handed out at the annual AACTA Awards, which rewards achievements in feature film, television, documentaries and short films.

Previously, direction for light entertainment and reality series were recognised in the Best Direction in Television category. However, when AACTA introduced craft awards for television programs in 2013, the Best Direction in Television award was split into two:  Best Direction in a Drama or Comedy and Best Direction in a Television Light Entertainment or Reality Series.

Nominees and winners

References

AACTA Awards